This is a list of the National Register of Historic Places listings in Williamson County, Texas.

This is intended to be a complete list of properties and districts listed on the National Register of Historic Places in Williamson County, Texas. There are eight districts, 66 individual properties, and one former property listed on the National Register in the county. Individually listed properties include one State Antiquities Landmark and 20 Recorded Texas Historic Landmarks while six districts include several more Recorded Texas Historic Landmarks including one that is also a State Antiquities Landmark.

Current listings

The publicly disclosed locations of National Register properties and districts may be seen in a mapping service provided.

|}

Former listings

|}

See also

National Register of Historic Places listings in Texas
Recorded Texas Historic Landmarks in Williamson County

References

External links
 

Buildings and structures in Williamson County, Texas
Williamson County

Registered Historic Places